The cross cultural arts festival known as INTERSECTIONS: A New America Arts Festival is a music, theater and dance festival held annually in Washington, D.C.

Description
It is held on the weekends around the spring equinox.  All performances are presented within the restored Atlas Performing Arts Center in D.C. The festival consists of 12 days of performing and visual arts celebrating the diversity, energy and excellence of artists and audiences from Washington, D.C. and beyond.

The subtitle for the festival is “Where Arts Merge and Cultures Meet.”

It was conceived and established in 2010 under the guidance of Jane Lang, and was curated by Mary Hall Surface, who continues to serve as the Festival Artistic Director. Major support for INTERSECTIONS is provided by the FIRE Fund of The Community Foundation of the National Capital Region, designed to promote interracial understanding and collaboration.

2010 Festival
Over 60 people, groups, and organizations performed during the first festival, held in 2010. The official list includes:
"The President's Own" US Marine Chamber Orchestra String Ensemble
Arena Stage
Arena Stage’s Voices of Now Mentor Ensemble
Capital City Symphony and the Young Virtuosi Chamber Orchestra
Christylez Bacon
Tom Chapin
Adele Robey
Anastasia Robinson
Andy Fahs
Beny Blaq
BodyMoves Contemporary Dance Company
Capital Jazz Project
Carlos César Rodriguez
Charles Williams
Children of the Gospel
Children's Chorus of Washington and Glorystar Children's Chorus
Chris Youstra
City Dance Ensemble
Coyaba Dance Theater
David Crowley
David Emerson Toney 
DCypher Dance
Ekene Okobi
Folger Shakespeare Library
GALA Hispanic Theatre
God's Miracles Gospel Quintet
Holly Bass
Imani
James Foster, Jr.
Jason Garcia Ignacio
Jay Walkers
John Hurd
Kathleen Gonzales
Kevin Reese
Kim Roberts
Levine School of Music
Lulu Fall
Marva Hicks
National Children's Museum
Northeast Senior Singers and the Delta Players
Og Ceol
Oran Sandel
Peter Dimuro
Peter Joshua Burroughs
Reverb
Sami Miranda
SpeakeasyDC
Step Afrika!
Steven Roberts
Sticky Mulligan
Symphony Space
Tappers with Attitude
The Extension Agents
The Joy of Motion Dance Center
Theater Alliance
Tom Teasley
Trio Grabielismo
Urban Artistry
Vertical Voices Playback Theatre
Wale Liniger
Washington Performing Arts Society
Washington Savoyards
Woolly Mammoth Theatre Company
Word-Beat

2011 Festival
Over 50 people and groups performed during the festival in 2011. A partial list includes: 
Adventure Theatre
African Continuum Theatre Company
AirBorne! DC and Zip Zap Circus USA
Arena Stage's Voices of Now Mentor Ensemble
BodyMoves Contemporary Dance Company
Capital City Symphony
City at Peace DC
Collide-O-Scope Music
Coyaba Dance Theater & Urban Artistry
DCypher Dance
The Delta Players and the Northeast Senior Singers
The Dinner Party
Dissonance Dance Theatre
Factory 449: a theatre collective
Pablo Grabiel
Trio Caliente
Furia Flamenca
Gibraltar
Matthew Hemerlein
Imani
The In Series
Cecilia Esquivel
Jenifer Deal
Jose Caceres
Jane Franklin Dance
Joy of Motion Dance Center
Angela Kariotis
Metropolitan Youth Tap Ensemble
Mosaic Harmony Community Choir & Ralph Herdon and Tradition
Nasar Abadey and Supernova
Not What You Think
New Galaxy Theatre Group
Quest
Reverb
Anastasia Robinson
Peter Burroughs
Carlos César Rodriguez
Scena Theatre
Kevin Reese
Sidwell Friends School Dance Ensemble
Silk Road Dance Company
Six Impossible Things
SpeakeasyDC
The Spilling Ink Project
Split This Rock
Step Afrika!
Sulu DC & Holly Bass Performance Projects
Theater of the First Amendment
Paige Hernandez 
Vertical Voices Playback Theatre 
Washington Ballet and the In Series
Word Dance Theater
Dianne Falk
Tom Teasley

2012 Festival
Over 50 people and groups were scheduled to perform during the 2012 festival. A partial list includes:
alight dance theater, DancEthos, & Glade Dance Collective
Adventure Theatre & Jazz Academy of Music
Arena Stage's Voices of Now Mentor Ensemble
Rachel Ann Cross
DC Area Playwrights’ Group
DCypher Dance
Dance Exchange's Teen Exchange & SYMAL's Youth Arts Ensemble
The Delta Players & Northeast Senior Singers with Ford's Theatre
Duke Ellington School of the Arts
Stephen Lang
Tom Teasley
Folger Poets
Tom Goss & Potomac Fever
Holloway Youth Project
Hueman Prophets
Illstyle and Peace Productions presented by Dance Place
Kennedy Center Theater for Young Audiences on Tour
New Galaxy Theatre Group
Not What You Think
Quest Visual Theatre
Shange Dance Productions
Sidwell Friends School Dance Ensemble
Source Festival  
SpeakeasyDC   
Split This Rock
National Gallery of Art & DC Youth Poetry Slam Team
Take Flight Productions
Vertical Voices & Synergy in Action Playback Theatre Companies
Young Playwrights' Theater & Holloway Youth Project
Christylez Bacon
B-Fly Entertainment
Bohemian Caverns Jazz Orchestra
Bowen McCauley Dance
Capital City Symphony
Public Displays of Motion
Dissonance Dance Theatre  
Great Noise Ensemble
Harmonious Blacksmith
The In Series
Jane Franklin Dance 
Just Tap
Rorschach Theatre
Jon Spelman with Tina Chancey
Vivre Musicale & Full Circle Dance Co.
Zip Zap Circus USA / Airborne DC!  
Samia Mahbub Ahmad
BodyMoves Contemporary Dance Company
Charles H. Clyburn
DC Swing!
Furia Flamenca
Imani
Kennedy String Quartet
Library of Congress presents The Saiyuki Trio with Rudresh Mahanthappa
Metropolitan Youth Tap Ensemble
Nasar Abadey and Supernova
Reverb & Euphonism
Spilling Ink Project & Srishti Dances of India

References

External links
Official INTERSECTIONS Website
INTERSECTIONS Tumblr Website. Contains videos from some of the artists scheduled to perform in 2012
INTERSECTIONS 2011 artists as shown on Fox 5 Morning News with Holly Morris.
DC Theatre Scene coverage of the 2010 INTERSECTIONS plays.
Review of 2010 Washington Savoyards' production of Treemonisha
The Washington Post recommends its "What To See" list from the 2011 INTERSECTIONS festival
 The Atlas Performing Arts Center's website listing of selected INTERSECTIONS performances

Dance festivals in the United States
Jazz festivals in the United States
Music festivals in Washington, D.C.
Theatre festivals in the United States
Recurring events established in 2010
2010 establishments in Washington, D.C.